Roberto Inglese (born 12 November 1991) is an Italian professional footballer who plays as a striker for Serie B club Parma.

Club career

Pescara
Born in Lucera, Apulia, Inglese started his professional career at Abruzzo club Pescara. At young age, Inglese had played for Pescara under-18 reserve B team at Berretti League in 2006–07 season. The Reserve B team merged with Reserve A team as the Pescara first team was relegated from Serie B in the 2006–07 season, thus the club's reserve team was no longer eligible to compete in the National Youth "Primavera" League. Inglese was a member of the youth teams and the reserve side until 2010. Inglese also made 6 league appearances in the Italian third division. Pescara won promotion back to the second division as the winners of the 2009–10 Lega Pro Prima Divisione Group B playoffs.

Inglese made his Serie B debut in the first round of 2010–11 Serie B season.

Chievo
On 28 August 2010, Chievo signed Inglese for €600,000 and Francesco Dettori for €50,000 in co-ownership deal. Co-currently Chievo sold Luca Ariatti to Pescara for €650,000 Thus made the deal a pure swap. On 31 August 2010, Inglese left for Lumezzane in temporary deal, re-joining Chievo teammate Lucas Finazzi. In June 2011 Chievo signed Dettori outright for free and Inglese for €129,000. (That season Chievo paid €29,000 in net to Pescara as the club sold Andrea Mengoni to Pescara in July 2010) In July 2011 the temporary deal was renewed and again on 16 July 2012.

Carpi (loan)
On 2 September 2013, Inglese was signed by Carpi. Inglese scored his first goal for Carpi in the 2–0 victory away to Spezia on 7 September 2013. Inglese made 21 appearances for Carpi as they went on to finish 12th in Serie B.

Carpi (second loan)
In July 2014, Inglese once again re-joined Carpi on loan, until 30 June 2015. Inglese scored his first goals of his second loan spell on 15 November 2014, a brace in a 5–2 win against Cittadella. Inglese followed up his goals against Cittadella with two late goals against Brescia seven days later to earn, nine man Carpi, a 3–3 draw.

Return to Chievo
After two years on loan at Carpi, Inglese returned to Chievo and made his first appearance for the club as well as his Serie A debut on 20 September 2015 in the 0–1 home defeat to Internazionale. He opened his scoring account later on 2 November where he scored his team's only goal in the 1–1 draw against Sampdoria, which was followed by two goals in the next two matches, the first against his former side Carpi and the second against Udinese, striking from 25 metres in an eventual 2–3 home loss. He finished the 2015–16 season by making 26 league appearances, scoring three times in the process, as Chievo finished Serie A in a comfortable 9th place.

On 13 May 2016, Inglese agreed a contract extension that would keep him at Stadio Marc'Antonio Bentegodi until 30 June 2020. Later on 29 November, he scored a brace in Chievo's 3–0 home defeat of Novara in the fourth round of 2016–17 Coppa Italia.

He kicked off 2017 by playing in the 1–0 away defeat to Fiorentina, and scored his first goal on 28 January, a last-minute winner against Lazio. On 12 February 2017, Inglese scored his first Serie A hat-trick in Chievo's 3–1 away win over Sassuolo, also missing a penalty during the same match, becoming only the fourth player in Chievo's history to reach this feat. On 22 October 2017, Inglese scored two goals in a 3–2 victory over fierce rivals Hellas Verona in the Verona derby.

Parma
Despite being acquired by Napoli in 2017, Inglese never played for gli Azzurri and, on 16 July 2019, he returned at Parma on loan with an obligation to buy after the 2018–19 season.

International career
He was called up to the senior Italy squad for World Cup qualifiers against Macedonia and Albania in October 2017.

Career statistics

References

External links
 Football.it Profile 
 

1991 births
Living people
People from Lucera
Association football forwards
Italian footballers
Serie A players
Serie B players
Serie C players
Delfino Pescara 1936 players
A.C. ChievoVerona players
F.C. Lumezzane V.G.Z. A.S.D. players
A.C. Carpi players
S.S.C. Napoli players
Parma Calcio 1913 players
Footballers from Apulia
Sportspeople from the Province of Foggia